Valašské Klobouky is a town in Zlín District in the Zlín Region of the Czech Republic. It has about 4,800 inhabitants. The historic town centre is well preserved and is protected by law as an urban monument zone.

Administrative parts

Villages of Lipina, Mirošov and Smolina are administrative parts of Valašské Klobouky.

Geography
It lies in the valley of the Klobučka River.

Valašské Klobouky is situated on the border of the White Carpathians and the Vizovice Highlands at the northern tip of the White Carpathians Protected Landscape Area.

History
The first written mention of Valašské Klobouky is from 1341. The village was promoted to a market town in 1356.

The village of Lipina was first mentioned in 1407. It was joined to Valašské Klobouky in 1976. Mirošov was first mentioned in 1460 and was joined to Valašské Klobouky in 1964. Smolina was first mentioned in 1503 and was joined to Valašské Klobouky in 1980.

Demographics

Sights

The Old Town Hall was first documented in 1567 and belongs to the most valuable buildings in the town. Today it houses the Town Museum. In front of the building is a historic pillory from the 16th century, one of the oldest preserved in the country. The second part of the museum's expositions is located in a historic house from 1781, the so-called Red House. It presents drapery, which is a traditional local craft.

The Church of the Exaltation of the Holy Cross was built in 1763. It has a Renaissance tower.

Notable people
Jan Matzal Troska (1881–1961), writer
Josef Valčík (1914–1942), soldier and resistance fighter
Ladislav Mňačko (1919–1994), Slovak writer and journalist
Bedřich Havlíček (1922–1994), regional historian and ethnographer

Twin towns – sister cities

Valašské Klobouky is twinned with:

 Zelów, Poland

References

External links

Cities and towns in the Czech Republic
Populated places in Zlín District
Moravian Wallachia